Serge Alexandre Stavisky (20 November 1886 – 8 January 1934) was a French financier and embezzler whose actions created a political scandal that became known as the Stavisky Affair.

Early life
Alexandre Stavisky was a Polish Jew born in modern-day Ukraine, whose Russian parents had moved to France.

Career
Stavisky tried various professions, working as a café singer, as a nightclub manager, as a worker in a soup factory, and as the operator of a gambling den. He received French citizenship in 1910. In the 1930s he managed municipal pawnshops in Bayonne but also moved in financial circles. He sold lots of worthless bonds and financed his "hockshop" on the surety of what he called the emeralds of the late Empress of Germany — which later turned out to be glass. In 1927, Stavisky was put on trial for fraud for the first time, charged with swindling millions of francs. However, the trial was postponed again and again, and he was granted bail 19 times.

Faced with exposure in December 1933, Stavisky fled. On 8 January 1934, the police found him in a Chamonix chalet dying from two gunshot wounds to the head. Surgeons struggled to save him but he died early in the hours of 9 January. Officially, Stavisky committed suicide, but it was widely speculated that he was murdered to keep him silent.

In the aftermath of Stavisky's death there was rioting in the streets of Paris, resulting in 250 arrests on 10 January as news of government involvement in the financial scandal broke.  The French premier  Camille Chautemps was forced to resign owing to the number of ministers wrapped up in the affair, as well as rumours that he had ordered Stavisky's assassination. An official public enquiry was ordered into the affair. Shortly before it began a senior judge, Albert Prince, who was due to be a witness, was found murdered on a railway line near Dijon, having been tricked into travelling there from Paris by means of a bogus telegram claiming his mother was very ill.

Death and legacy
Stavisky died on 8 January 1934, in Chamonix. He was buried in Père Lachaise Cemetery in Paris.

The lyrics of the 1934 tango  contrasts Stavisky and other figures, arriving to the pessimistic conclusion that no one cares to tell good from evil.

Hollywood released a depiction in 1937 with Stolen Holiday, starring Claude Rains as Stavisky's fictional counterpart, Stefan Orloff, and Kay Francis as his wife. Stolen Holiday asserted unequivocally that Orloff was shot by police and his death made to look like a suicide.

In Forces occultes, a film commissioned in 1942 by the "Propaganda Abteilung", a delegation of Nazi Germany's propaganda ministry within occupied France, Stavisky was presented as both a Freemason and a crook.

In 1974, film director Alain Resnais told the story in the film Stavisky... that featured Jean-Paul Belmondo in the title role and Anny Dupérey as his wife Arlette.

References

Further reading
 Paul Jankowski, Stavisky - A Confidence Man in the Republic of Virtue, (2002) 
 Large, David Clay, Between Two Fires: Europes Path in the 1930s (W.W.Norton: 1990) pp 24–58, a scholarly account

1886 births
1934 suicides
People from Kiev Governorate
Ukrainian Jews
French people of Ukrainian-Jewish descent
French financiers
20th-century French criminals
Suicides by firearm in France
Burials at Père Lachaise Cemetery
1934 deaths
Death conspiracy theories
Emigrants from the Russian Empire to France